Gunspinning refers to the old west tradition and Hollywood legend of a cowboy gunslinger twirling his pistol around his trigger finger. Gunspinning is a western art such as trick roping, and is sometimes referred as gunplay, gun artistry, and gun twirling. Gunspinning is seen in many classic TV and film Westerns, such as Shane and The Good, the Bad and the Ugly.

The majority of gunspinning is seen as a precursor to putting the gun back in its holster. It may be used as a flashy ending to a trick shot, or just to impress or intimidate an opponent.

Notable examples
Some modern day Western performers and actors such as Dony Robert and Joey Rocketshoes Dillon can spin guns in each hand, and even incorporate juggling and tosses over the shoulders and around the body. Dillon is a multiple world champion at this craft.

In 1942, former boxer Ben Foord played a practical joke on his wife by sneaking up her with a pistol and pretending to be a desperado. Foord attempted gunspinning in the American frontier style and accidentally shot himself in the face, killing himself.

Film and television 
 Rodd Redwing performed Alan Ladd's fancy gunspinning seen in the 1953 film Shane during the climatic showdown.
 Actor Robert Culp showcased his gunspinning talents on "The Man From Salinas" episode of The Rifleman (season 4, episode 20, aired February 12, 1962).
 Entertainer Sammy Davis Jr. was skilled at fast and fancy gunspinning and appeared on television variety shows showing off this skill. He appeared in Western films and as a guest star on several television Westerns. For instance, he also demonstrated gunspinning on The Rifleman in "Two Ounces of Tin" (season 4, episode 21, aired February 19, 1962).
 In the RoboCop franchise (1987–1993), police officer Alex Murphy (RoboCop) is known for spinning his "Auto 9" (a modified Beretta 93R) before holstering it inside his mechanical leg. In the franchise's fictional universe, Murphy is inspired by his son's love of the popular television hero T.J. Lazer.
 Johnny Ringo (Michael Biehn) and his gunspinning duel with Doc Holliday (Val Kilmer) in the 1993 film Tombstone. (Doc parodies Ringo's gunspinning moves by duplicating them with a metal stirrup cup for comic effect.) Champion Gunspinner Joey Dillon breaks down how these moves were done in an issue of True West Magazine.
In the 1995 movie The Quick and The Dead, Cort (Russell Crowe) spins a Colt while looking for a gun to compete in the gun-fight tournament in the town of Redemption.
In the 2002 movie Star Wars: Episode II – Attack of the Clones, Jango Fett spins his WESTAR-34 blaster pistol after using it to kill Jedi Coleman Trebor.
Similarly, Jango Fett's cloned son, Boba Fett, spins his blaster pistol following his encounter with Stormtroopers in The Mandalorian (2020).
 In Resident Evil: Apocalypse (2004), lead actress Milla Jovovich spins her dual Colt .45's before holstering them.

Video games 
 In the 2011 MMO Star Wars: The Old Republic, the Smuggler class incorporates gunspinning their blaster pistols as part of skills and animations. One advanced class, aptly named Gunslinger, does the same with their dual blasters. 
 In the 2012 video game Counter-Strike: Global Offensive, the player can spin the Desert Eagle pistol while examining the weapon.
 In the 2014 video game Destiny, at least three exotic hand cannons — The Last Word, The First Curse, and the Ace of Spades — have a gunspinning animation as the weapon is drawn from its holster. In Destiny 2, The Last Word keeps its ready animation, and the Ace of Spades is spun after reloading.
 In the 2015 video game Mortal Kombat X, Erron Black is often seen spinning his revolvers before the fight begins, after completing his X-Ray move, and in his victory pose.
 In the video game series Metal Gear, Revolver Ocelot is often seen incorporating this trick with one or two revolvers in hand(s) (hence his codename).
 Likewise, in the 2016 FPS video game Overwatch, the character Jesse McCree spins his revolver in a number of circumstances: upon hero selection, upon reloading, and for the duration of an emote titled 'Gunspinning'.
 In the 2017 video game Fortnite, one of the pistols, the six shooter (based on a Ruger Blackhawk ) Whenever this gun is drawn, the player will twirl it for a few split seconds.
In the video game Injustice 2, Red Hood twirls his twin guns during his fight intros.
 In the 2017 video game Star Wars Battlefront II, the ARC Trooper spins their dual blasters in their preview animation.
 In the 2018 video game Red Dead Redemption 2, protagonist Arthur Morgan can perform a gunspinning trick to holster his right revolver.
 In every iteration (1999-2018) of the video game series Super Smash Bros., Fox McCloud can be seen spinning his gun before holstering it during his victory animation.
 In the 2020 video game Cyberpunk 2077, all of the reload animations for the fictional Malorian Arms 3516 pistol twirl the weapon after the magazine has been put in the weapon.

See also
Cowboy action shooting
Fast draw
Gun fu

References 

Shooting sports
Firearm techniques